Al Wathba National Insurance Co P.S.J.C (AWNIC) is a national insurance company of the United Arab Emirates. It was established in 1996, with its registered head office in Abu Dhabi. Sheikh Saif Bin Mohamed Bin Butti Al Hamed is the chairman, and Bassam Chilmeran is the CEO.

Products
Al Wathba National Insurance Company offers insurance services for individuals, family, and corporate clients in life, medical, and personal line insurance (Motor, Property, Engineering, Energy, Marine, Marine Cargo etc.).

References

Financial services companies established in 1996
Insurance companies of the United Arab Emirates